Josh Malerman is an American novelist, short story writer, film producer, and one of two singer/songwriters for the rock band The High Strung. He is best known for writing horror and his post-apocalyptic novel, Bird Box, which was the inspiration of the Netflix film Bird Box. In 2020, he founded the production company Spin a Black Yarn with manager Ryan Lewis; their first film, We Need to Do Something, was shot in secret during the COVID-19 pandemic.

Career
Before his debut novel, Bird Box, was published by ECCO/HarperCollins, Malerman had written fourteen manuscripts, never having shopped one of them. Bird Box was published in the United Kingdom and United States in 2014 to much critical acclaim.

As the singer/songwriter of the Detroit rock band The High Strung, Malerman toured the country for six years, playing approximately 250 shows a year. Malerman wrote many of the rough drafts for these novels in the passenger seat between cities on tour. He says this about those days: "I never saw the books with dollar signs in my eyes. It was no hobby, that's for sure, it was the real thing and always has been, but I was happy, then, simply writing, and while I blindly assumed they'd be published one day, I had no idea how something like that occurred."

When a friend from high school, Dave Simmer, who had worked with authors and properties in Hollywood, asked Malerman's permission to send one of his books to some people he knew in the publishing industry. Malerman sent Goblin, a collection of novellas that take place in the titular city of Goblin. Malerman subsequently spoke with an agent and editors. He says this of the part Simmer played in his career: "There were two things at play at that point in time; one, Dave was a ghostly benefactor, golden-hearted and smart, descending from the sky to help me.  And two, what may sound like luck couldn't have become good fortune if I wasn't armed with a dozen novels to talk shop with."

For many of Malerman's books, he has done live readings with a theatrical bent, Bird Box, Black Mad Wheel, and Goblin among them.  "Our readings are more than just me at a podium," Malerman says. "Steve Greene will be doing live music while other people act out the scene I'm reading. It's more than an excerpt."

A limited edition of Goblin was published on Halloween in 2017, by Earthling Publications.

The song "The Luck You Got" from The High Strung album Moxie Bravo is featured as the theme song to the US version of the show Shameless.

Black Mad Wheel (ECCO/HarperCollins) was published in May 2017.

In October 2017, Malerman was the subject of a documentary, Quilt of Delirium, directed by Scott Allen.

Del Rey Books purchased the rights to Unbury Carol, a fantastic horror-western published in April 2018.

Cemetery Dance published a hardcover limited edition of On This, the Day of the Pig in October 2018.

Bird Box was adapted into a post-apocalyptic film of the same name. It was directed by Susanne Bier and written by Eric Heisserer, stars Sandra Bullock, Trevante Rhodes, and John Malkovich, and was released on December 21, 2018 by Netflix.

Del Rey purchased three of Malerman's previous limited editions: A House at the Bottom of a Lake, Goblin, and On This, the Day of the Pig and all will be published in 2020.

Malerman won a 2020 Bram Stoker Award for his short story "One Last Transformation" his first win among 8 nominations.

Personal life
Malerman lives in Michigan with his fiancée, artist/musician Allison Laakko.

Awards
Michigan Notable Book Award (2015, won - Bird Box)
Shirley Jackson Award (2015, nominated - Bird Box)
James Herbert Award (2015, nominated - Bird Box)
Bram Stoker Award for Best First Novel (2015, nominated - Bird Box)
Bram Stoker Award for Superior Achievement in long fiction (2016, nominated - The Jupiter Drop)
Bram Stoker Award for Superior Achievement in a novel (2017, nominated - Black Mad Wheel)
Bram Stoker Award for Superior Achievement in a collection (2017, nominated - Goblin)
Bram Stoker Award for Superior Achievement in a novel (2018, nominated - Unbury Carol)
Bram Stoker Award for Superior Achievement in a novel (2019, nominated - Inspection)
Bram Stoker Award for Superior Achievement in a novel (2020, nominated - Malorie)
Bram Stoker Award for Superior Achievement in short fiction (2020, won - "One Last Transformation")

Bibliography

Novels
Bird Box (2014, ECCO/HarperCollins)
Black Mad Wheel (2017, ECCO/HarperCollins)
Goblin (2017, Earthling Publications)
Unbury Carol (2018, Del Rey/Penguin Random House)
On This, The Day of the Pig (2018, Cemetery Dance)
Inspection (2019, Del Rey/Penguin Random House)
Carpenter's Farm (2020, serialized on joshmalerman.com)
Malorie (2020, Del Rey/Penguin Random House)
Pearl  (2021, Del Rey/Penguin Random House) (originally published as On This, the Day of the Pig)
Ghoul n' the Cape (2022, limited edition, Earthling Publications)
Daphne (2022, Del Rey/Penguin Random House)
Spin a Black Yarn (2023, Del Rey/Penguin Random House)

Novellas
Ghastle and Yule (2014, published as a Kindle Single)
A House at the Bottom of a Lake (2016, published by This is Horror)
Dandy (2020, published by Cemetery Dance)

Short stories
"A Fiddlehead Party on Carpenter's Farm" (2015, published in Shadows Over Main Street)
"Clark! Stop!" (2015, published in the Metropolitan de'Troit)
"Plots" (2015, published in the Metropolitan de'Troit)
"Danny" (2016, published in Scary Out There)
"The Bigger Bedroom" (2016, published in Chiral Mad 3)
"Who is Bringing Milk to Me?" (2016, published in Out of Tune– Book 2)
"I Can Taste the Blood/Vision I" (2016, published in I Can Taste The Blood)
"The One You Live With" (2016, published in Gutted: Beautiful Horror Stories)
"The Givens Sensor Board" (2016, published in Lost Signals)
"Matter" (2016, published in "Cemetery Dance" Issue 74/75)
"The Jupiter Drop" (2016, published in You, Human)
"The House of the Head" (2017, published in New Fears)
"Your Boy" (on joshmalerman.com)
"Jessica Malerman" (2017, published in Dark Moon Digest magazine)
"Lime" (2017, published in Hardboiled Horror)
"Basic Shade" (2018, published in Primogen: Origin of Monsters)
"Room 4 at the Haymaker" (2018, published in Lost Highways: Dark Fictions from the Road)
"Adam's Bed" (2018, published in Doorbells at Dusk)
"Tenets" (2018, published in Hark! The Herald Angels Scream)
"Frank, Hide" (2018, published in Phantoms)
"Fafa Dillinger's Box" (2019, published in A Little Red Book of Requests)
"Dead Witch's Hair" (2019, published in A Little Red Book of Requests)
"Breadcrumbs" (2019, published in A Little Red Book of Requests)
"1000 Words on a Tombstone: Dolores Ray" (2019, published in In Darkness Delight Volume One)
"By Post" (2019, published in Weird Tales #363)
"1000 Words on a Tombstone: Bully Jack" (2019, published in In Darkness Delight Volume Two)
"Alarms of Eden" (2019, published in the StokerCon 2019 Souvenir Anthology)
"From the Living Room of Cottage 6" (2019, published in Ten Word Tragedies)
"Summertide" (2019, published in Shock Totem 11)
"One Last Transformation" (2020, published in Miscreations)
"A Ben Evans Film" (2020, published in Final Cuts)
"Decorum at the Deathbed" (2020, Audible Original)
"The Cries of the Cat" (2020, published in Don't Turn Out the Lights)
"Special Meal" (2021, published in When Things Get Dark)
"Provenance Pond" (2021, published in Beyond the Veil)
"Door to Door" (2021, published in Shadow Atlas)
"Mrs. Addison's Nest" (2022, published in Dark Stars)
"A Solid Black Lighthouse on a Pier in the Cryptic" (2022, published in Orphans of Bliss)
"Dungeon Punchinello" (2022, published in The Hideous Book of Hidden Horrors

Cinema 
Bird Box with Sandra Bullock, directed by Susanne Bier (2018, produced by Netflix)

Albums
Bid Me Off (1998, Malerman/Owen)
A Lot of Old Reasons (1999, Malerman/Owen)
Mary Muzzle (1999, solo)
Here Comes The Cheer (2000, The High Strung)
As Is (2000, The High Strung)
Soap (2001, EP, The High Strung)
Sure as Hell (2002, EP, The High Strung)
These Are Good Times (2003, The High Strung)
Follow Through on Your Backhand (2004, EP, The High Strung)
Moxie Bravo (2005, The High Strung)
Get the Guests (2007, The High Strung)
Phantom of the Opry (2008, solo)
CreEPy (2008, EP, The High Strung)
Ode to the Inverse (2009, The High Strung)
Dragon Dicks (2010, The High Strung)
Live at Guantanamo Bay, Cuba (2010, The High Strung)
Malerman/Owen I (2010, Malerman/Owen)
Clown Car (2011, The High Strung)
Malerman/Owen II (2012, Malerman/Owen)
Preposterous! (2012, solo)
?Posible o' Imposible? (2012, The High Strung)
I, Anybody (2014, The High Strung)
 Quiet Riots (2019, The High Strung)
HannaH (2021, The High Strung)
Address Unknown (2023, The High Strung)

References

External links

Musicians from Detroit
Writers from Detroit
American horror novelists
People from Ferndale, Michigan
Novelists from Michigan
American male novelists
American male short story writers